Raffaele "Lello" Marciello (born 17 December 1994) is a Swiss-born Italian professional racing driver. A former member of the Ferrari Driver Academy, he was the 2013 European Formula Three Champion, a reserve and test driver for the Sauber Formula One team in 2015, and spent three seasons competing in the GP2 Series. He switched to GT racing in 2017 and became a works Mercedes-AMG driver ahead of the 2018 campaign. In 2022, Marciello earned his first major endurance race victory by winning the Spa 24 Hours.

Career

Karting
Marciello debuted in karting in 2005 and raced in various European championships, working his way up from the junior ranks to progress through to the KF2 category by 2010.

Formula Abarth
In 2010,  Marciello graduated to single-seaters, racing in the newly launched Formula Abarth series in Italy for JD Motorsport. He won opening race at Misano and race at Varano and amassed another two podiums it brought him third place in standings. Also he and fellow Formula Abarth champion Brandon Maïsano became members of the Ferrari Driver Academy.

Formula Three

Marciello stepped up to Italian Formula Three Championship in 2011 and joined Prema Powerteam. He claimed wins at Misano and Adria and another four podiums, finishing third and losing rookie title to Michael Lewis, but overcoming Maïsano by seven points.

In 2012 Marciello continued his collaboration with Prema Powerteam into Formula 3 Euro Series. and the revived FIA European Formula Three Championship. In FIA F3 he finished 2nd in the championship, with nine podiums including seven wins. In Euro Series he finished 3rd with ten podiums and six wins. In both championships he scored more wins than anybody else.

He remained in F3 for 2013, and emerged as a pre-season favourite following his impressive results in the previous year and dominant performances in pre-season testing.

Toyota Racing Series
During the 2012 off-season Marciello competed in New Zealand-based Toyota Racing Series, taking ninth place in the championship with a win at Hampton Downs.

GP2 Series

Marciello had been looking to be driving in the GP2 Series or World Series by Renault for 2014 after testing both cars in Catalunya in October 2013.

On 20 January 2014, the Ferrari Driver Academy announced Marciello would be racing in GP2 in 2014. However, they did not confirm the team he would be competing with. On 18 February, it was announced he would be driving for the Racing Engineering team.

Marciello achieved his first GP2 victory in the feature race at Spa-Francorchamps after an intense fight with McLaren junior driver Stoffel Vandoorne in the closing stages.

He joined Trident Racing for 2015, but struggled to capitalize on his 2015 debut, finishing seventh overall.

Marciello raced with Russian Time, replacing the Campos-bound Mitch Evans, in the 2016 season.

Formula One

On 26 November 2014, Marciello made his Formula One debut behind the wheel of the Ferrari F14 T, during that day's post-season test at the Yas Marina Circuit.
He set the second fastest time of the session, half a second adrift of Pascal Wehrlein in the Mercedes F1 W05 Hybrid.
On 31 December 2014 it was announced that Marciello had signed as test and reserve driver for the Sauber Formula One team for 2015. In January 2016, it was announced that Marciello had been dropped by Sauber and had split with the Ferrari Driver Academy for personal reasons.

Racing record

Karting career summary

Racing career summary

† As Marciello was a guest driver, he was ineligible to score points.
* Season still in progress.

Complete Formula 3 Euro Series results
(key)

† Driver did not finish the race, but was classified as he completed over 90% of the race distance.

Complete FIA Formula 3 European Championship results
(key)

† Driver did not finish the race, but was classified as he completed over 90% of the race distance.

Complete GP2 Series results
(key) (Races in bold indicate pole position) (Races in italics indicate fastest lap)

Complete Formula One participations
(key) (Races in bold indicate pole position; races in italics indicate fastest lap)

Complete FIA Formula 2 Championship results
(key) (Races in bold indicate pole position) (Races in italics indicate points for the fastest lap of top ten finishers)

Complete GT World Challenge Europe Endurance Cup results

*Season still in progress.

Complete GT World Challenge Europe Sprint Cup results
(key) (Races in bold indicate pole position) (Races in italics indicate fastest lap)

Complete Intercontinental GT Challenge results

Complete Bathurst 12 Hour results

Complete IMSA SportsCar Championship results
(key) (Races in bold indicate pole position; races in italics indicate fastest lap)

* Season still in progress.

Complete ADAC GT Masters results
(key) (Races in bold indicate pole position) (Races in italics indicate fastest lap)

* Season still in progress.

Notes

References

External links

 
 

1994 births
Living people
Sportspeople from Zürich
Italian racing drivers
Formula Abarth drivers
Italian Formula Three Championship drivers
Formula 3 Euro Series drivers
British Formula Three Championship drivers
FIA Formula 3 European Championship drivers
GP2 Series drivers
FIA Formula 2 Championship drivers
24 Hours of Daytona drivers
JD Motorsport drivers
Prema Powerteam drivers
Racing Engineering drivers
Trident Racing drivers
Russian Time drivers
Mercedes-AMG Motorsport drivers
Blancpain Endurance Series drivers
Asian Le Mans Series drivers
Nürburgring 24 Hours drivers
ADAC GT Masters drivers
WeatherTech SportsCar Championship drivers
Strakka Racing drivers
M2 Competition drivers
Karting World Championship drivers
Virtuosi Racing drivers
24H Series drivers
Craft-Bamboo Racing drivers
Swiss racing drivers